Murhyen Kaster Mereck Bindoumou  (born 1 September 1988) is a Congolese footballer who plays as a defender.

Club career 
Bindoumou was born in Brazzaville, Republic of the Congo. He began his career with ACNFF. After the successful 2007 FIFA U-20 World Cup he moved to French Ligue 1 side AJ Auxerre which he left in summer 2009 to join Spanish club CD Baza loan. After his return to Auxerre in summer 2010 he was released.

International career 
Bindoumou represented the Congo U-20 at the 2007 FIFA U-17 World Cup in Korea Republic and played four games in the tournament.

References 

1988 births
Living people
Sportspeople from Brazzaville
French footballers
Republic of the Congo footballers
Association football defenders
AJ Auxerre players
Republic of the Congo expatriate sportspeople in France
Expatriate footballers in France
Republic of the Congo expatriate sportspeople in Spain
Expatriate footballers in Spain